Usha Malhotra is an Indian politician . She was a Member of Parliament, representing Himachal Pradesh in the Rajya Sabha the upper house of India's Parliament as a member of the Indian National Congress.

References

1933 births
Living people
Rajya Sabha members from Himachal Pradesh
Indian National Congress politicians from Himachal Pradesh
Women in Himachal Pradesh politics
Women members of the Rajya Sabha